Lana Wood (born Svetlana Lisa Gurdin; March 1, 1946) is an American actress and producer. She made her film debut in The Searchers as a child actress and later achieved notability for playing Sandy Webber on the TV series Peyton Place and Plenty O'Toole in the James Bond film Diamonds Are Forever. Her sister was Natalie Wood.

Early life
Wood was born Svetlana Lisa Gurdin to Russian immigrant parents, Maria Zudilova (1908–1998) and Nicholas Zacharenko (1912–1980). They had each left Russia as child refugees with their parents following the Russian Civil War, and they grew up far from their homeland. Her father's family left Vladivostok after her grandfather, a chocolate-factory worker who joined the anti-Bolshevik civilian forces, was killed in a street fight in 1922; they settled in Vancouver, British Columbia, with their relatives, then moved to San Francisco. Lana's maternal grandfather owned soap and candle factories in Barnaul; he left Russia with his family in 1918 after his eldest son was killed by the Red Army, and settled in a Russian community in Harbin, China. Maria married Alexander Tatuloff there in 1925, and they had a daughter, Olga Viripaeff (1928–2015), before divorcing in 1936.

When Nicholas and Maria married in February 1938, she brought her daughter Olga, then known as Ovsanna, to the household, sharing joint custody with her ex-husband in El Cerrito, California. The couple had two daughters together; the first was Natalie, known as "Natasha", the Russian diminutive. The family settled in Santa Monica, near Hollywood, and changed their surname to Gurdin. Svetlana, known as "Lana", was born there. Her parents changed the surname of her elder sister, making her Natalie Wood, after she started her acting career as a child. She was named after her director Irving Pichel's friend Sam Wood. When Lana made her film debut in The Searchers (1956), her mother was asked under what last name Lana should be credited. Maria agreed to use "Wood" for Lana, building on Natalie's recognized work.

Through her paternal cousin Kaisaliisa Zacharenko (1947–2005), Wood is distantly related by marriage to baseball player Tim Lincecum.

Career
In her early career, Wood usually played in films in which Natalie appeared. Starting in the 1960s, her own career took off. After appearing on the short-lived drama series The Long, Hot Summer, she landed the role of Sandy Webber on the soap series Peyton Place. She played the role from 1966 to 1967. She turned down the Karen Black role in Easy Rider (1969), a decision she now cites as the worst mistake she has made in her career. She was cast as a Bond girl, Plenty O'Toole, in the James Bond film Diamonds Are Forever (1971). In 1970, Wood was approached by Hugh Hefner and she agreed to pose for Playboy. The Playboy pictures appeared in the April 1971 issue, along with Wood's poetry.

Wood has more than 20 other films and over 300 television series to her credit, including The Fugitive, Bonanza, Mission: Impossible, Wild, Wild West, Police Story, Starsky & Hutch, Nero Wolfe, Fantasy Island, and Capitol. After appearing in the horror film Satan's Mistress (1982), she retired from acting, concentrating on her career as a producer, but since 2008 she has returned to acting in a number of low-budget films. Wood is a character in the Steve Alten book Meg: Hell's Aquarium (2009).

She wrote a memoir, Natalie, A Memoir by Her Sister (1984), and another, Little Sister (2021), in which she claimed veteran actor Kirk Douglas sexually assaulted her sister Natalie when she was just 16.

Personal life

Wood has been married six times:
 Jack Wrather Jr. – (1962–1963; annulled when she was 16 years old)
 Karl Brent – (1964–1965; divorced)
 Stephen Oliver – (1966–1966; annulled)
 Dr. Stanley William Vogel (1968–1968; divorced)
 Richard Smedley – (1972–1976; divorced) one child, Evan Taylor Smedley Maldonado (August 11, 1974 – July 18, 2017), by whom she has three grandchildren.
 Allan G. Balter (1979–1980; divorced)

Between marriages, Wood dated actors Dean Stockwell, Adam West, Eddie Fisher, Warren Beatty, Sean Connery, Alain Delon and Ryan O'Neal, as well as talent agent Guy McElwaine, producer Jerome Hellman and composer Leslie Bricusse. For most of the 1980s she was in a relationship with Alan Feinstein. Feinstein was at Natalie's funeral with her.

Wood's sister Natalie was married to actor Robert Wagner until her drowning death on November 29, 1981. She has long been at odds with both Wagner and his third wife Jill St. John, who coincidentally also appeared in Diamonds Are Forever.

Filmography

Film

Television

Footnotes

Bibliography

References

External links

 
 
 
 Interview with Lana Wood at Classic Film & TV Cafe

1946 births
20th-century American actresses
21st-century American actresses
Actresses from Santa Monica, California
American film actresses
Film producers from California
American people of Russian descent
American television actresses
Television producers from California
American women television producers
Living people
Russian Orthodox Christians from the United States
American women film producers